"Baddest Girl in Town" is the third single from American rapper Pitbull's ninth studio album Dale, which won the Grammy Award for Best Latin Rock, Urban or Alternative Album. The track features singer Mohombi and reggaeton rapper Wisin.

Music video
The music video for the song features six models in fishnet stockings and corsets storming into a bank and robbing it at gunpoint, then fleeing on motorcycles and evading police pursuit until they reach Pitbull, who is waiting for them on a boat.

Charts

Certifications

References

2015 singles
Pitbull (rapper) songs
Mohombi songs
Wisin songs
Spanish-language songs
2015 songs
Songs written by Wisin
Songs written by Pitbull (rapper)
RCA Records singles
Songs written by Mohombi
Songs written by Alexandru Cotoi